Anaimalai is a taluk in Coimbatore district in the Indian state of Tamil Nadu. 

Agricultural day work is the main occupation. Paddy, banana, sugarcane and other crops are grown in the area. Anaimalai is a pilgrimage spot, due to the worship of the goddess Maasani Amman.

History
Anaimalai was carved out of Pollachi taluk in 2018.

Geography
As it is close to Kerala, it receives both southwest and northeast monsoon through the year.

It encompasses around 31 villages.

The Uppar River runs through Anaimalai and it's a drainage made by Anamalai city people.

Demographics
It had a population of 17,208 according to the 2011 Census, in 4,933 families. 8,279 are males and 8,929 are females; the average sex ratio is 1,079.

The literacy rate is 78.9%. Thus Anaimalai has lower literacy rate compared to 84% of Coimbatore district. The male literacy rate is 85.59% and the female literacy rate is 72.67% in Anaimalai.

Transport
Anaimalai is well connected by road, rail, and air. Coimbatore International Airport is the nearest airport. Anaimalai Railway Station and Pollachi Railway Station are the nearest.

Economy
The economy of Anaimalai is predominantly dependent on agriculture and independent businesses. Coir manufacturing units operate in the area with materials sourced from local farms.

Culture
Masaniamman Temple, Perumal Swamy Temple, Someswaran Temple, Saibaba Temple, Azhukku Swamy Siddhar Temple & Deivakulam Kaaliamman Temple are in the area.

Education
Schools include:

 Anaimalai Govt. Hr Sec School
 VRT Girls Hr Sec school
 Oxford Matriculation Hr Sec School
 Deeksha Vidhya MAndir Nursery & Primary School 
 Forest Hill Academy Mat. Hr. Sec. School

References

Cities and towns in Coimbatore district
Geography of Coimbatore